Ophrys drumana is an orchid species endemic to France and found notably in the Drôme departement. It is pollinated by the bee Megachile albonotata (Megachilidae).

It is part of the O. bertolonii group.

Names 
 French : Ophrys de la Drôme
 German : Drôme-Ragwurz

See also 
 List of the orchids of Metropolitan France

References 

Orchids of Europe

Endemic flora of France
Drôme
Plants described in 1988
drumana